Diplomatic relations between France and Switzerland have traditionally been close, through important economic and cultural exchanges. Switzerland and France (which is part of the European Union), share about 600 km of border (prompting strong cross-border cooperation) and a language (French is one of Switzerland's four official languages).

History 

In 1516, France and Switzerland signed a Treaty of Perpetual Peace (« paix perpétuelle »). A military treaty was signed in 1521.

France has been appointing ambassadors to Switzerland since the 16th century and Switzerland's first representation abroad, in 1798, was in French capital Paris (closely followed by a consulate in Bordeaux). By the end of the 19th century, the only country with a legation in the Swiss capital Bern was France.

As of 2015, there were four state visits of Presidents of France in Switzerland: Armand Fallières in August 1910, François Mitterrand on 14–15 April 1983, Jacques Chirac in 1998 and François Hollande on 15–16 April 2015.

Economy 

194,000 Swiss people live in France - the largest Swiss community outside Switzerland - while 163,000 French people live in Switzerland - the largest French community outside France. 150,000 French nationals cross the border to work in Switzerland, half of all foreign cross-border commuters.

France is Switzerland's third-largest trading partner (after Germany and Italy) and the two are integrated economically via Swiss treaties with the European Union. Switzerland is also part of the Schengen Area, which abolishes border checks between member states.

Resident diplomatic missions 
 France has an embassy in Bern and consulates-general in Geneva and Zürich.
 Switzerland has an embassy in Paris and consulates-general in Lyon, Marseille and Strasbourg.

See also
 France–Switzerland border
 French invasion of Switzerland
 Swiss migration to France
 Switzerland–European Union relations

Notes and references

External links 
 Bilateral relations Switzerland–France

 
Switzerland
Bilateral relations of Switzerland